Unit 29155 is a Russian (GRU) unit tasked with foreign assassinations and other activities aimed at destabilizing European countries. The unit is thought to have operated in secret since at least 2008, though its existence only became publicly known in 2019.

Organization and method
The Unit is commanded by Maj. Gen.  and based at the headquarters of the 161st Special Purpose Specialist Training Center in eastern Moscow. Its membership has included veterans from Russian wars in Afghanistan, Chechnya, and Ukraine, identified as Denis Sergeev (aka Sergei Fedotov), Alexander Mishkin (aka Alexander Petrov), Anatoliy Chepiga (aka Ruslan Boshirov, a Hero of the Russian Federation, Russia's highest honor), Sergey Lyutenkov (aka Sergey Pavlov), Eduard Shishmakov (aka Eduard Shirokov), Vladimir Moiseev (aka Vladimir Popov), Ivan Terentyev (aka Ivan Lebedev), Nikolay Ezhov (aka Nikolay Kononikhin), Alexey Kalinin (aka Alexei Nikitin), and Danil Kapralov (aka Danil Stepanov).

Le Monde reported in December 2019, citing French intelligence contacts, that 15 agents connected with Unit 29155 visited the Haute-Savoie region of the French Alps between 2014 and 2018 including Alexander Petrov and Ruslan Boshirov who are believed responsible for the Skripal poisoning. High-ranking GRU officer Denis Vyacheslavovich Sergeev (alias Sergei Fedotov) has been identified by British authorities as the commander of the team that poisoned Sergei Skripal, a former Russian military officer and double agent for the British intelligence agencies, and his daughter Yulia Skripal. Anatoliy Chepiga, one of the suspected Skripal attackers, was photographed at Averyanov's daughter's wedding in 2017.

The unit's operations were described as sloppy by security officials since none of the operations to which it has been linked were successful. Several actions had to be broken off without success, such as the attempted coup in Montenegro in 2016, which was staged before the country joined NATO. In several cases, enough evidence was left behind to enable the perpetrators to be identified. Security experts wondered whether this method was chosen on purpose to signal all opponents of the Russian regime that they were nowhere safe. Eerik-Niiles Kross, a former intelligence chief in Estonia, says this type of intelligence operation has become part of psychological warfare.

Activities
Unit 29155 was linked by the investigative Bellingcat website to the attempted assassinations of Bulgarian arms dealer Emilian Gebrev in April 2015 and the former GRU Colonel Sergei Skripal in March 2018, both possibly overseen by the same agent. According to Ben Macintyre in the London Times in December 2019, the unit is believed to be responsible for a destabilisation campaign in Moldova and a failed pro-Serbian coup plot in Montenegro in 2016 including an attempt to assassinate the Prime Minister Milo Đukanović and occupy the parliament building by force. Russia has denied all accusations.

Andrej Babiš, the prime minister of the Czech Republic, announced on 17 April 2021 that Unit 29155 was behind the 2014 Vrbětice ammunition warehouses explosions. Czech police seek information from the public on two suspects: Alexander Mishkin (aka Alexander Petrov), Anatoliy Chepiga (aka Ruslan Boshirov). These are the same men identified by Bellingcat in the Skripal poisoning case.

Alleged bounty program 

      
In 2020, a CIA assessment reported that Unit 29155 operated a Russian bounty program that offered cash rewards to Taliban-linked militants to kill U.S. and other coalition soldiers in Afghanistan. The assessment said several US military personnel died as a result of a bounty program. According to the New York Times, on 1 July, the National Intelligence Council produced a document in which various intelligence agencies assessed the credibility of the existence of a bounty program based on the available evidence, gleaned in part from interrogations of captured Islamist militants by Afghanistan's government. Anonymous officials who had seen the memo said that the "C.I.A. and the National Counterterrorism Center had assessed with medium confidence—meaning credibly sourced and plausible, but falling short of near certainty”—that bounties had been offered. Other parts of the intelligence community, including the National Security Agency, said they "did not have information to support that conclusion at the same level", and so had lower confidence in the conclusion. Both Russia and the Taliban have denied the existence of a program. In July 2020, Defense Secretary Mark Esper stated that General Kenneth McKenzie and General Scott Miller, the top U.S. military commander in Afghanistan, did not think "the reports were credible as they dug into them." General Kenneth McKenzie, the commander of U.S. Central Command, said that he found no "causative link" between reported bounties to actual U.S. military deaths.

See also
Advanced persistent threat or APT
PLA Unit 61398, "APT 1"
PLA Unit 61486
Russian interference in the 2016 Brexit referendum

References

GRU
Covert organizations
2008 establishments in Russia
Russian assassins